Nana Alexandria (Nana Giorgis asuli Aleksandria; born 13 October 1949) is a Georgian chess player. A three-time Soviet women's champion, she was the challenger in two matches for the Women's World Chess Championship.

Career

Alexandria was USSR women's champion in 1966, 1968 (jointly), and 1969. She was the Women's World Championship challenger in 1975 and 1981. In 1975 she lost to Nona Gaprindashvili (+3 =1 −8). In 1981 she drew with Maia Chiburdanidze (+4 =8 −4), who retained her title as champion. Alexandria played for the Soviet national team in the Women's Chess Olympiads of 1969, 1974, 1978, 1980, 1982, and 1986. She was one of the contributing players of the USSR team that dominated the Women's Olympiads of the 1980s.

FIDE awarded her the Woman International Master (WIM) title in 1966 and the Woman Grandmaster (WGM) title in 1976. Alexandria also received the title International Arbiter in 1995. She was the chairperson of the FIDE Women's Commission from 1986 to 2001.

Personal life 
She is the mother of the Georgian politician Giga Bokeria.

In 2021, Alexandria appeared in the documentary Glory to the Queen alongside Nona Gaprindashvili, Maia Chiburdanidze and Nana Ioseliani.

Further reading
 New In Chess, no. 7, 1986, pages 66–68.
 Nana Alexandria – a Pillar of Women's Chess, ChessBase, October 13, 2009.

References

External links

 
 
 
 

1949 births
Living people
Soviet female chess players
Female chess players from Georgia (country)
Chess woman grandmasters
Chess arbiters
Chess administrators
People from Poti